Amy Jo Johnson (born October 6, 1970) is an American actress, musician, and filmmaker. As an actress, Johnson is known for her roles as Kimberly Hart on Mighty Morphin Power Rangers, Julie Emrick on Felicity, and Jules Callaghan on Flashpoint.

Johnson has directed short films including Bent (2013) and Lines (2014), along with two feature-length films, The Space Between (2017) and Tammy's Always Dying (2019).

Early life
Amy Jo Johnson was born on October 6, 1970, in Hyannis, Massachusetts, the daughter of Greig Johnson Sr., a car salesman, and Christine Johnson (d. 1998), a clothing store manager. She has two siblings, a brother and a sister. Though born in Hyannis, Johnson grew up in Dennis, Massachusetts, and attended Dennis-Yarmouth Regional High School. As a child, she studied gymnastics.

Career

Acting
Johnson moved to New York City at 18 to pursue an acting career. She attended the Lee Strasberg Theatre Institute and the American Musical and Dramatic Academy. She later moved to Los Angeles to audition for her first part.

Johnson's breakthrough role came less than a month after she moved to Los Angeles, when she was selected to portray Kimberly Hart, the Pink Ranger, in Mighty Morphin Power Rangers, the first installment of the Power Rangers franchise. Despite the series being a huge success and having brought Johnson international recognition as an actress, the show brought her little financial security, as she and the others were paid only $600 a week for their work on the show, which included stunt work and public appearances; none of the cast received any royalty payments from re-runs of episodes they appeared in. During Johnson's time with the franchise, whose productions were non-union and not subject to safety codes standardized in union contracts, Johnson faced multiple instances of danger of physical harm; while filming Mighty Morphin Power Rangers: The Movie, she was almost set on fire during a stunt and, during Turbo: A Power Rangers Movie, she was almost electrocuted. Johnson ultimately made the decision to leave the show in 1995, passing the role of the Pink Ranger to Australian actress Catherine Sutherland. In an appearance on I Love the '90s, Johnson jokingly stated that having been the Pink Power Ranger was something she would "never live down." In later years, Johnson stated that becoming famous from the show was at times overwhelming and had given her nightmares, but that overall, she learned many things and is grateful to the show and her fans. In all, Johnson's character has appeared in 138 episodes in the franchise. She, alongside former co-star Jason David Frank, made a cameo appearance in the 2017 film Power Rangers, though not as Power Rangers themselves. In 2023, Johnson announced that she had declined to reprise the role of Kimberly Hart in the 30th anniversary Power Rangers special on Netflix but that she wished the special and her former co-stars well while also saying that she had other fun things in store for her fans that year.

After she left the series in November 1995, Johnson went on to star in Disney Channel's Susie Q and in the Saved by the Bell: The New Class episode "Backstage Pass." In 1997, she starred in NBC's adaptation of Lois Duncan's novel Killing Mr. Griffin and played a gymnast with an eating disorder in Perfect Body. Johnson also participated in the film Without Limits. She also reprised her role as Kimberly Hart in Turbo: A Power Rangers Movie.

In September 1998, Johnson was invited to play Julie Emrick in The WB series Felicity. She held a main role on Felicity for three seasons and was a special guest in its fourth and final season.

In the early 2000s, Johnson had roles in Interstate 60, Pursuit of Happiness, and Infested, as well as television film Hard Ground. She also had guest starring roles on Spin City and ER. In 2004, she starred as Stacy Reynolds in the fourth season of The Division. In the latter half of the decade, she had recurring roles in Wildfire and What About Brian, and she starred in television films Magma: Volcanic Disaster on Syfy and Fatal Trust on Lifetime. In addition, Johnson took parts in a few independent films: Veritas, Prince of Truth and Islander.

Beginning in 2008, Johnson became a series regular on Flashpoint as Constable Jules Callaghan, a member of the fictional Strategic Response Unit of the Toronto Police service. She was nominated for a Gemini Award for her performance. The show aired new episodes through 2012.

Since 2012, Johnson has had guest roles on a few shows including a recurring role as Hayley Price in the Universal spy drama series Covert Affairs.

Directing
Johnson has directed and produced two acclaimed short films: Bent (2013) and Lines (2014). She then went on to direct the feature film The Space Between. In 2018, she began working on her next film, Tammy's Always Dying. The movie received praise from critics, particularly for Huffman's and Phillips' performances. It is available at video on demand release on May 1, 2020.

She is a member of Film Fatales, a non-profit organization that advocates for women's parity in the entertainment industry. In mid-2021, she announced she would be directing an episode of Superman & Lois for the show's second season.

Music
Johnson is a singer-songwriter and has released three albums: The Trans-American Treatment (2001), Imperfect (2005), and Never Broken (2013). She has performed in the Los Angeles area with the Amy Jo Johnson Band. In December 2007, she contributed guest vocals to Koishii & Hush's cover of The Cars track "Since You're Gone", which was released as a single. The song is also part of the album Souvenirs, released in 2008.

Some of Johnson's music has been featured on television shows. Johnson's character in Felicity was originally described as a dancer, but with Johnson's input, the producers rewrote the character as a singer and guitarist. As a result, Johnson was able to perform her own song, "Puddle of Grace", on the show. This song was included in the album Felicity Soundtrack (1999) successfully released by Hollywood Records. As a result of the reception of the song, another Johnson song, "Clear Blue Day", was also featured on the show. In The Division, her song "Cat in the Snow" is the theme song from one of the episodes. In Flashpoint, her songs "Dancing In-Between" and "Goodbye" were featured.

In 2013, she performed the song "God" in her movie Bent. In 2014, her song "Lines" had featured in her short film Lines. Her 2017 song "Cracker Jacks" was the theme song from the movie The Space Between.

Personal life
Johnson was previously married to Olivier Giner. The two divorced in 2017 and have one child together, a daughter born in 2008. Johnson resides in Toronto, Canada, and became a Canadian citizen on June 23, 2015, making her a dual citizen of the United States and Canada.

Filmography

Film

Television

Short films

Discography

Studio albums
 The Trans-American Treatment (2001)
 Imperfect (2005)
 Never Broken (2013)

As a featured performer
 "Clear Blue Day", "Puddle of Grace" from the series Felicity (1998)
 "Motherless Child", "What's Wrong", "Two Words", "In A Rainbow", "First Love", from the TV movie Sweetwater (1999)
 "Cat in the Snow" from series The Division (2004)
 "Goodbye", "Dancing in Between" from series Flashpoint (2008)
 "God" from the movie Bent (2013)
 "Lines" from the short Lines (2014)
 "Cracker Jacks" from the movie The Space Between (2017)

Awards and nominations

References

External links

 
 
 

1970 births
Living people
20th-century American actresses
20th-century American singers
20th-century American women singers
20th-century Canadian actresses
21st-century American actresses
21st-century American singers
21st-century American women singers
21st-century Canadian actresses
Actresses from Massachusetts
American emigrants to Canada
American expatriates in Canada
American female artistic gymnasts
American film actresses
American stage actresses
American television actresses
American women film directors
American women screenwriters
Canadian film actresses
Canadian Film Centre alumni
Canadian stage actresses
Canadian television actresses
Canadian women film directors
Canadian women screenwriters
Film directors from Massachusetts
Lee Strasberg Theatre and Film Institute alumni
Naturalized citizens of Canada
People from Dennis, Massachusetts
Screenwriters from Massachusetts
Singers from Massachusetts
American Musical and Dramatic Academy alumni